GNOME-DB is a database application by the GNOME community. The project aims to provide a free unified data access architecture to the GNOME project for all Unix platforms. GNOME-DB is useful for any application that accesses persistent data (not only databases, but data), since it now contains a data management API.

Support for GObject Introspection and Vala.

Starting with the 4.2 series, GNOME-DB corresponds to the libgda library.

The libgnomedb library provides "widgets" that allow users to interact with data in databases. It uses the libgda generic database API, so it can use MySQL, Postgres, Sqlite, etc.

GNU Data Access 

GNU Data Access (GDA) is a set of plugin APIs, defined as generic as possible, so that any kind of data source can be accessed through them, to provide uniform access to different kinds of data sources (databases, information servers, mail spools, etc.). Similar to Open Database Connectivity (ODBC) or Java Database Connectivity (JDBC), GNU Data Access is a wrapper but with more features to access several database engines. GNU Data Access has been developed as a complete architecture that provides everything required to access data sources.

Libgda is mainly a database and a data abstraction layer. It is a library that implements the interfaces defined by the GDA architecture, for both the client and the server parts. It additionally provides a bunch of tools to help with the development and the management of data sources via the GDA APIs. Libgda was part of the GNOME-DB project but has been separated from it to allow non-GNOME applications to be developed based on it.

The libgda library is released under the terms of the GNU Lesser General Public License (LGPL), which allows for commercial applications to be developed based on libgda. Its command-line and UI tools are under the GNU General Public License (GPL).

Libgda is a (relatively small) database access library:
 features a metadata extractor (to know all about database objects in a common way)
 comes with an SQL console application (like mysql, psql or sqlite3 consoles)
 Libgda is coded in C, depends on GLib (and integrates with it), and LibXML2.
 Libgda's UI extension depends on GTK+
 Libgda's graphical tools depend on GTK+ and optionally GooCanvas and GraphViz

See also 
 UnixODBC – a free and open-source implementation of ODBC
 SQLite

References

External links 
 GNOME-DB home page
 GNOME-DB roadmap
 libgda git
 How to choose between Libgda and SQLite

Free database management systems
Free software programmed in C
GNOME libraries

sv:GNOME-DB